Kendrick Mountain Wilderness is a  wilderness area in the U.S. State of Arizona. It lies north of the city of Flagstaff on the Coconino Plateau in Coconino County.  Kendrick Mountain Wilderness was designated a protected Wilderness area by Congress in 1984.  About two thirds of the wilderness is contained within the Kaibab National Forest.  Kendrick Mountain Wilderness contains  Kendrick Peak, upon which a fire lookout has been located since the early 1900s.   

In the year 2000 the Kendrick Wilderness and Kendrick Peak were substantially affected by a 15,000 acre (61 km2) wildfire, known as the "Pumpkin Fire", the results of which are still quite evident to hikers or visitors to the peak. In an effort to return the forest to its "pre-fire" state, cattle are sometimes grazed near the Kendrick Mountain Trail trailhead.

See also
 List of U.S. Wilderness Areas
 List of Arizona Wilderness Areas

External links
 Kendrick Wilderness provided by Wilderness.net
 Kendrick Wilderness provided by USDA Forest Service

Wilderness areas of Arizona
Protected areas of Coconino County, Arizona
IUCN Category Ib
Kaibab National Forest
Coconino National Forest